Latin Extended-G is a Unicode block containing additional characters for phonetic transcription.  The Latin Extended-F and -G blocks contain the first Latin characters defined outside of the Basic Multilingual Plane (BMP).

As of 2023, only a few fonts support this block. Ones that are free include Gentium, Andika, Symbola and Unifont.

Block

History
The following Unicode-related documents record the purpose and process of defining specific characters in the Latin Extended-G block:

External links 
Wiktionary:Appendix:Unicode/Latin Extended-G

References 

Latin-script Unicode blocks
Unicode blocks